Najeebullah may refer to:

 Mohammad Najibullah, Afghan politician
 Najibullah Zadran, Afghan cricketer
 Najeebullah (cricketer), Pakistani cricketer